Central 5 also Central Five (C5) is an informal political cooperation between Austria, the Czech Republic, Hungary, Slovakia, and Slovenia that began in 2020. It is organised in the format of ministers responsible for foreign affairs. The group was initiated by the Austrian Foreign Minister Alexander Schallenberg.

The main reason for closer cooperation between the countries is the coordination of the activities connected with the COVID-19 pandemics. Meetings are focused on border crossing and the exchange of views on EU activities to overcome the economic and social crisis caused by the pandemic.

Current representatives

Country comparison

Meetings

References 

Central Europe
Foreign relations of Slovenia
Politics of Slovenia
Foreign relations of Austria
Politics of Austria
Foreign relations of Slovakia
Politics of Slovakia
Foreign relations of Hungary
Politics of Hungary
Foreign relations of the Czech Republic
Politics of the Czech Republic